John Thomas "J.T." Harding is an American country music songwriter. He has written songs for artists such as Uncle Kracker, Kenny Chesney, Keith Urban and Darius Rucker.

History
Harding is the biological son of actor and comedian Jay Thomas, who put him up for adoption at an early age (the two later met and reconciled). His adoptive parents, Larry and Kendra Harding, moved from Nashville, Tennessee to Grosse Pointe, Michigan when Harding was young. His adoptive father worked at a rock radio station in Detroit. In the late 1990s, Harding moved to California, where he worked at Tower Records. He also competed on Rock & Roll Jeopardy! He also performed and released music under the stage name JTX.

Harding moved to Nashville at the suggestion of a song publisher while working as an assistant for the band Linkin Park. After this, Harding co-wrote Uncle Kracker's "Smile". He has also written number one songs for other country music artists, including Darius Rucker, Keith Urban Dierks Bentley, Blake Shelton, and Kenny Chesney.

Discography
(as JTX)

Albums

Singles

References

American country songwriters
People from Grosse Pointe, Michigan
Songwriters from Michigan
Living people
Year of birth missing (living people)